James R. Barker may refer to:

 James R. Barker (academic) (fl. 2000s–2010s), professor of organizational theory and strategy
 James R. Barker (businessman) (fl. 1950s–2000s), shipping executive
 James R. Barker (1976 ship) named for the executive
 James Rollins Barker (fl. 1940s–1980s), Canadian diplomat